The Ecole nationale des sciences appliquées de Safi is a public engineering school located in Asfi, it is part of the National Schools of Applied Sciences- ENSA located throughout the country at major city universities in the country.

ENSA Safi is an academic institution within the Cadi Ayyad University and under the supervision of the Ministry of Higher Education and Scientific Research. The ENSAS specializes in all aspects of higher education, scientific research and technical training of engineers and managers as well as postgraduate courses.

Programmes offered
Telecommunication and Networks engineering
Computer Engineering and Artificial Intelligence (GIIA)
Aeronautical Engineering and Space Technologies (GATE)
Industrial engineering
Process engineering and ceramic materials

Education in Morocco